Flora station is a historic Baltimore & Ohio Railroad depot which served Flora, Illinois. The depot was built from 1916 to 1917 by Frank Nichols; its design features several architectural styles, including Italian Renaissance Revival, Romanesque Revival, and Classical Revival. After the depot opened, the B&O Railroad became the largest employer in Flora, employing approximately half of the town's population through the mid-1920s, and was credited with the town's growth and economic success. The B&O also sponsored community groups such as a band and baseball teams. Passenger service to the station ended in 1973, and the empty station is now surrounded by vacant lots. The depot was added to the National Register of Historic Places on February 20, 1998, as the Baltimore and Ohio Railroad Depot.

References

Railway stations on the National Register of Historic Places in Illinois
Italian Renaissance Revival architecture in the United States
Romanesque Revival architecture in Illinois
Neoclassical architecture in Illinois
Railway stations in the United States opened in 1917
Buildings and structures in Clay County, Illinois
Former Baltimore and Ohio Railroad stations
Railway stations closed in 1973
Former railway stations in Illinois
1917 establishments in Illinois
1973 disestablishments in Illinois
National Register of Historic Places in Clay County, Illinois